Engineering Research Centers (ERC) are university-led institutions developed through the National Science Foundation (NSF) Directorate of Engineering.  While ERCs are initially funded by the NSF, they are expected to be self-sustaining within 10 years of being founded.  The Engineering Research Centers program was originally developed in 1984 with the mission of removing disparity between academic and industrial engineering applications.  In this way, engineering students would, theoretically, be better prepared to enter the engineering workforce.  As a result, the United States would gain a competitive advantage over other countries.  There have been three generations of Engineering Research Centers.  Each of these generations has been specifically designed to meet the dynamic engineering demands of the United States.  Due to the limited amount of funding available for ERCs, the program is competitive; out of 143 proposals submitted in 2008, only 5 were awarded centers.  Commercialization of academic research is one of the primary goals of NSF ERCs.

Generation one

The first generation of NSF ERCs began between 1985 and 1990 and encouraged academic institutions to focus education on manufacturing and commercial design.  This first generation comprised 18 centers.

Generation two

The National Science Foundation began funding the second generation of centers beginning in 1994 and continued until 2006.  This second generation included 22 centers and was focused on manufacturing efficiency.  Unlike the first generation of ERCs, the second generation encouraged multi-university partnerships and also focused on developing pre-college, engineering-bound students.  In addition, the second generation of ERCs was designed to help academic research reach commercialization.  However, unlike later generations, the second generation focused on domestic programs and largely ignored the potential in global partnerships.

Generation three

Beginning in 2008, the NSF began accepting proposals for the third generation (Gen-3) of Engineering Research Centers.  Gen-3 ERCs were largely created due to decreased student interest in sciences and engineering and an increasingly global economy.  To meet these challenges, the Gen-3 ERCs were commissioned to increase interest in innovation and unify different engineering pipelines (i.e. domestic and international institutions, academic and commercial institutions). Gen-3 programs particularly focus on nanotechnology.

Partner structure
The mission of Gen-3 ERCs differs from the mission of the second generation ERCs in that Gen-3 centers embrace a global perspective. In creating the Gen-3 ERCs, the NSF recognized that streamlining existing processes is not enough to remain competitive in a global market.  Instead, Gen-3 programs focus on also developing and globally commercializing novel engineering solutions.  Like second generation ERCs, Gen-3 programs use a multi-university model and are required to include between 1 and 4 domestic partners.  At least one of these partner universities must serve a large population of underrepresented groups.  Gen-3 programs are also required to include between 1 and 3 non-domestic partners.  Faculty from non-partner universities may become affiliated in order to fill "expertise gaps".

Above and beyond university partner requirements, Gen-3 ERCs are required to partner with domestic pre-college institutions, particularly local middle schools and high schools.  ERCs must also have "industry/practitioner" members that pay fees to use ERC resources.  These industry/practitioner members may include businesses and hospitals.

ERCs are required to support Research Experiences for Undergraduates, Research Experiences for Teachers, and pre-college (Young Scholars) summer research programs.  In addition, ERCs partner with local K-12 institutions to increase the abilities of science and engineering educators.  Because of the global focus of Gen-3 ERCs, centers often host foreign exchange students.

Funding structure

Funding for an ERC may not exceed $3,250,000 for the first year, but this limit increases by $250,000 per year until it reaches a maximum of $4,000,000.  The NSF committed enough funds ($9,750,000) to support three new centers beginning in the summer of 2012.  Corporate partners are permitted to supplement this funding, and their contributions can be quite significant.  For example, in 2006, over 50 organizations invested in the Engineering Research Center for Compact and Efficient Fluid Power (CEFP) and added approximately $3 million to the CEFP's budget.  In some circumstances, ERCs obtain additional funding through other governmental agencies.

Current centers 

Currently, 18 ERCs are supported by the National Science Foundation.  These centers are listed below along with the years during which they were founded.  Programs founded before 2008 are second generation programs; programs founded in or after 2008 are Gen-3 programs.

Manufacturing

Biotechnology and health care

Energy, sustainability, and infrastructure

Microelectronics, sensing, and information technology

Past (graduated) centers

The following centers no longer receive funding from the National Science Foundation. Centers founded in or after 1994 are second generation ERCs.  Centers founded before 1994 are first generation.

Manufacturing

Biotechnology and health care

Energy, sustainability, and infrastructure

Microelectronics, sensing, and information technology

References

External links
 ERC Association

National Science Foundation